The UIC Flames men's soccer team represents the University of Illinois at Chicago in all NCAA Division I men's college soccer competitions. The Flames previously played in the Horizon League, but moved to the Missouri Valley Conference on July 1, 2022.

Seasons

References

External links 
 
 2019 Men's Soccer Record Book

 
1981 establishments in Illinois
Association football clubs established in 1981